Kampong Selapon is a village is Temburong District, Brunei, about  from the district town Bangar. The population was 224 in 2016. It is one of the villages within Mukim Batu Apoi. The postcode is PC3351.

Facilities 
Selapon Primary School is the village's government primary school. It also shares grounds with Selapon Religious School, the village's government school for the country's Islamic religious primary education.

References 

Selapon